The mottled-tailed shrew mouse (Pseudohydromys fuscus) is a species of rodent in the family Muridae. It is found in West Papua, Indonesia and Papua New Guinea.

References

Pseudohydromys
Rodents of Papua New Guinea
Mammals of Western New Guinea
Mammals described in 1952
Taxonomy articles created by Polbot
Rodents of New Guinea
Taxa named by Eleanor Mary Ord Laurie